A petition for certiorari before judgment, in the Supreme Court of the United States, is a petition for a writ of certiorari in which the Supreme Court is asked to immediately review the decision of a United States District Court, without an appeal having been decided by a United States Court of Appeals, for the purpose of expediting the proceedings and obtaining a final decision.

Certiorari before judgment is rarely granted. Supreme Court Rule 11 provides that this procedure will be followed "only upon a showing that the case is of such imperative public importance as to justify deviation from normal appellate practice and to require immediate determination in this Court." A writ of certiorari before judgment may be granted only in federal cases, and is not necessary in those cases where a statute authorizes a direct appeal from a District Court to the Supreme Court.

Well-known cases in which the Supreme Court has granted certiorari before judgment and heard the case on an expedited basis have included Ex parte Quirin (1942),  U.S. v. United Mine Workers (1947), Youngstown Sheet & Tube Co. v. Sawyer (1952), U.S. v. Nixon (1974), Dames & Moore v. Regan (1981), Northern Pipeline Co. v. Marathon Pipe Line Co. (1982), U.S. v. Booker (2005), Department of Commerce v. New York (2019), and Whole Woman's Health v. Jackson (2021).

In U.S. v. Windsor (2013), both sides filed petitions for certiorari before judgment, but it was only granted after judgment by the Second Circuit.

List of petitions granted
The Supreme Court granted certiorari before judgment only three times between 1988 and 2004, and zero times from then until February 2019. Since 2019, the court has granted certiorari before judgment in more cases.

See also
Shadow docket

Notes

References
S. Shapiro et al., Supreme Court Practice (BNA Books, 10th ed. 2013), section 2.4

Supreme Court of the United States
United States appellate procedure